Jared Michel Mead (born June 23, 1991) is an American politician serving as a member of the Snohomish County Council, representing the 4th district since 2020. A member of the Democratic Party, he previously served as a member of the Washington House of Representatives from 2019 to 2021. He was also a member of the Mill Creek City Council.

Career
Mead won the election on November 6, 2018 as a Democrat with fifty-two percent of the vote over Republican Mark Harmsworth with forty-eight percent.

He was appointed to the District 4 seat on the Snohomish County Council on April 8, 2020, filling a vacancy left by Terry Ryan, who resigned to become director of Aerospace Economic Development. Mead did not run for re-election and instead ran for election in the county council in 2020.

References

Mead, Jared
Living people
21st-century American politicians
1991 births
Snohomish County Councillors